Torre San Giorgio is a comune (municipality) in the Province of Cuneo in the Italian region Piedmont, located about  southwest of Turin and about  north of Cuneo.

Torre San Giorgio borders the following municipalities: Moretta, Saluzzo, Scarnafigi, and Villanova Solaro.

Demographic evolution

References

External links
 www.comune.torresangiorgio.cn.it/

Cities and towns in Piedmont